Mohinder Singh Amar (born 15 January 1954) is a Malaysian field hockey player. He competed in the men's tournament at the 1976 Summer Olympics.

References

External links

1954 births
Living people
Malaysian male field hockey players
Olympic field hockey players of Malaysia
Field hockey players at the 1976 Summer Olympics
Malaysian people of Punjabi descent
Malaysian sportspeople of Indian descent
Asian Games medalists in field hockey
Asian Games bronze medalists for Malaysia
Medalists at the 1978 Asian Games
Field hockey players at the 1978 Asian Games